Dipsas cisticeps, the neotropical snail-eater,  is a non-venomous snake found in Bolivia, Argentina, and Paraguay.

References

Dipsas
Snakes of South America
Reptiles of Bolivia
Reptiles of Argentina
Reptiles of Paraguay
Reptiles described in 1885
Taxa named by Oskar Boettger